Stara Rzeka may refer to the following places in Poland:
Stara Rzeka, Lower Silesian Voivodeship (south-west Poland)
Stara Rzeka, Kuyavian-Pomeranian Voivodeship (north-central Poland)